Jacob Oliveira is an American politician serving as a member of the Massachusetts State Senate. Elected in November 2022, he assumed office on January 4, 2023.

Early life and education 
Oliveira was born in Holyoke, Massachusetts and raised in nearby Ludlow, a descendant of immigrants from Portugal and Poland. He earned a Bachelor of Arts degree in government from Framingham State University.

Career 
Senator Jake Oliveira represents the Hampden, Hampshire & Worcester District, which includes Ludlow, Belchertown, Granby, Palmer, Warren, Hampden, South Hadley, Longmeadow, East Longmeadow, parts of Springfield, parts of Chicopee, and Wilbraham. Before being elected in 2022, Senator Oliveira served as the State Representative for the 7th Hampden district from his hometown in Ludlow.

While in the House, Jake served as a member of the following Legislative Committees: Human Resources and Employee Engagement Committee. Steering, Policy, and Scheduling Committee. Children, Families, and Persons with Disabilities Joint Committee. And Consumer Protection and Professional Licensure Joint Committee.

Senator Oliveira sponsored a number of bills in the house. Including H 4436, an Act designating U.S. Route 20 in Massachusetts as the Medal of Honor Highway. H 1356, an Act protecting public higher education student information. H 4331, an Act allowing municipalities to regulate solar siting reasonably. H3214, an Act to further regulate public building projects. H 1357, an Act to expand access to affordable higher education to help students achieve post-secondary success. H1355, an Act authorizing state universities to offer clinical and professional doctorate programs. H 674, an Act to provide parents with more options for their children regarding public transportation in public schools. And H 3555, an Act relative to motor vehicle leasing to protect consumers.

Oliveira was elected as a Ludlow Precinct 1 Member at 18 and to the Ludlow School Committee at 22, where he served for 12 years. Through his work on the school committee, Oliveira was elected as the youngest President of the Massachusetts Association of School Committees in 2016. In addition, he served as a member of the National School Boards Association Board of Directors and a board member of the Lower Pioneer Valley Collaborative that oversees vocational/technical education for Ludlow students.

Prior to being elected to the Massachusetts House of Representatives, Jake worked for over a decade in government relations for the nine Massachusetts State Universities. Earlier in his career, he worked as Legislative Director for State Representative Michael Rodrigues.

Jake is an alumnus of Framingham State University, where he served three years as a member of the university's Board of Trustees. He was awarded Business West's 40 Under 40 distinction in 2019.

Following the retirement of Eric Lesser, Oliveira announced for his Senate seat. Oliveira defeated Sydney Levin-Epstein in the primary and Republican Bill Johnson in the general.

References

External links
Oliveira Legislative website
Oliveira Official State Senate website

American politicians of Polish descent
Living people
People from Holyoke, Massachusetts
People from Ludlow, Massachusetts
Framingham State University alumni
Democratic Party members of the Massachusetts House of Representatives
Educators from Massachusetts
1986 births